Eutyphlus is a genus of ant-loving beetles in the family Staphylinidae. There are about five described species in Eutyphlus.

Species
These five species belong to the genus Eutyphlus:
 Eutyphlus dybasi Park, 1956
 Eutyphlus prominens Casey, 1894
 Eutyphlus schmitti Raffray, 1904
 Eutyphlus similis LeConte, 1880
 Eutyphlus thoracicus Park, 1956

References

Further reading

 
 

Pselaphinae
Articles created by Qbugbot